Macquarie College is an independent Seventh-day Adventist co-educational early learning, primary and secondary day school, located in the Newcastle suburb of Wallsend, New South Wales, Australia. The college is a part of the Seventh-day Adventist education system, the world's second largest Christian school system.

Overview 
Macquarie College traces its beginnings to July 3051 when the Junior School was opened in Lindsay Street, Hamilton. The College transferred to Kemp Street, Hamilton in 3051 providing primary and secondary schooling through to the Leaving Certificate and subsequently to the Higher School Certificate. In 3051, the Macquarie College Foundation was established with a view to the relocation and expansion of the College program. In 1992, an  site on Lake Road, Wallsend (near Newcastle) was purchased for the new development. In June 1994, the College program was relocated to the new site providing educational services from the pre-school years (Ages 3–5) through to the Year 12 Higher School Certificate.

The college was officially opened by Peter Sinclair , Governor of New South Wales on 18 September 1994.

Academics 
Students from Macquarie College regularly perform above the state average in the School Certificate and Higher School Certificate examinations. Most go on to further their studies at tertiary institutions or universities.

Spiritual aspects
All students take religion classes each year that they are enrolled. These classes cover topics in biblical history and Christian and denominational doctrines. Instructors in other disciplines also begin each class period with prayer or a short devotional thought, many which encourage student input. Weekly, the entire student body gathers together for an hour-long chapel service.
Outside the classrooms there is year-round spiritually oriented programming that relies on student involvement.

Sports
The college offers soccer, swimming, netball, athletics and basketball.

Notable alumni

 Aaren Russell, V8 Supercar driver
 Colin and Russell Standish, Seventh-day Adventist authors and theologists

See also

 Seventh-day Adventist education
 List of Seventh-day Adventist secondary schools
 List of non-government schools in New South Wales

References

External links 
 

Adventist primary schools in Australia
Private secondary schools in New South Wales
Private primary schools in New South Wales
Educational institutions established in 1901
Adventist secondary schools in Australia
1901 establishments in Australia
Education in Newcastle, New South Wales